Thomas G. Blomberg is an American criminologist. He is an expert in criminology research and public policy; delinquency, education and crime desistance; penology and social control; and victim services. He is currently the Dean, Sheldon L. Messinger Professor of Criminology, and the executive director of the Center for Criminology and Public Policy Research at the Florida State University College of Criminology and Criminal Justice.

Education 
He attended the University of California at Berkeley, obtaining his B.A. in Sociology in 1969 and his M.S. and Ph.D. in Criminology in 1970 and 1973 respectively.

Research interests 
 Elderly financial fraud
 Life course 
 Cognition turning points 
 Criminological research and public policy 
 Delinquency, education, and crime desistance 
 Penology and social control and victim services

Grants 
Principal Investigator, Domestic Violence Homicide Prevention Program in Palm Beach County (a $150,000 study funded by the National Institute of Justice)

Principal Investigator, An Assessment of Jail Alternatives (a $150,000 project funded by the Broward County Sheriff's Office)

Principal Investigator, Juvenile Justice Educational Enhancement Program (an $18 million project funded by the Florida Department of Education and U.S. Department of Education)

Principal Investigator, The Juvenile Justice No Child Left Behind Collaboration Project (a $2 million project funded by the U.S. Department of Justice, Office of Juvenile Justice and Delinquency Prevention)

Recent publications 
George B. Pesta, Thomas G. Blomberg, Javier Ramos, and J.W. Andrew Ranson. 2018. “Translational Criminology: Toward Validated Best Practices.” American Journal of Criminal Justice.

Brancale, Julie Mestre, Thomas G. Blomberg, and George B. Pesta. 2018. “Elder Financial Exploitation in the United States.” In Emil W. Plywaczewski and Ewam Guzik Makaruk (Eds.) Current Problems of the Penal Law and Criminology. Eighth Edition. Warsaw, Poland: C.H. Beck.

Blomberg, Thomas G. 2018. “Making a Difference in Criminology: Past, Present and Future.” American Journal of Criminal Justice.

Nadel, Melissa, George B. Pesta, Thomas G. Blomberg, William D. Bales, and Mark Greenwald. 2018. “Civil Citation: Diversion or Net Widening?” Journal of Research in Crime and Delinquency, 55:2 (2018): 278- 315.

Thomas G. Blomberg, Julie Mestre Brancale, Kevin M. Beaver, William D. Bales. 2016. “Advancing Criminology and Criminal Justice Policy” Routledge.

Selected publications 
Thomas G. Blomberg, William D. Bales, Alex R. Piquero. “Is Educational Achievement a Turning Point for Incarcerated Delinquents Across Race and Sex?” Journal of Youth and Adolescence. 41.2 (2012): 202-216

Lucken, Karol and Thomas G. Blomberg. “American Corrections: Reform without Change.” The Oxford Handbook of Sentencing and Corrections. Joan Petersilia and Kevin Reitz, eds. New York: Oxford University Press. 2012. 341-359

Blomberg, Thomas G., William D. Bales, Karen Mann, Alex R. Piquero, and Richard A. Berk. “Incarceration, Education and Transition from Delinquency.” Journal of Criminal Justice. 39.4 (2011): 355–365.

Blomberg, Thomas G. and Karol Lucken. American Penology: A History of Control, Enlarged Second Edition. Edison, NJ: Transaction Publishers. 2010.

References

Year of birth missing (living people)
Living people
Florida State University faculty
American criminologists